The Blue Yonder Merlin is a Canadian-designed and -built two-seat, high-wing monoplane with taildragger undercarriage. It can be built as a basic ultra-light, an advanced ultra-light or amateur-built aircraft.

Design and development

The Merlin was designed in 1986 by John Burch, who intended to use it in his flight training school. Burch was disappointed with the early ultralights available, in particular their inability to take off and land in crosswinds. The aircraft wing was inspired by the Lazair's wing and used the same aluminum "D" cell and foam rib construction techniques and constant-tapered wing planform. The first example flew in 1987.

The Merlin won the Pilot's Choice Award as Best Ultralight at the Aircraft Sport Expo in 1988.

Burch formed Macair Industries in Baldwin, Ontario to produce the aircraft. Initially there were two versions: the Merlin M50 powered by the  Rotax 503 two-stroke powerplant and the Merlin GT and Sport 65 version powered by the  Rotax 532 and later 582. The  Honda-based CAM 100 engine was also available as an option.

In 1991 Burch moved production of the Merlin to Michigan, USA under a new company name, Malcolm Aircraft. Within a short time that company went out of business and the Merlin was picked up by a new company in 1993 operating under the name of Merlin Aircraft who marketed the Merlin GT. After three years the company ceased business and the rights to the design were acquired by Blue Yonder Aviation of Indus, Alberta who continue to produce kits. Marketing in the United States was conducted by Aerocomp (now Comp Air) for some time, but this arrangement has been ended.

The Merlin was used as the testbed aircraft for development of the Hexadyne P60 engine.

The Merlin EZ uses the same foam-rib construction as previous models, but with a constant-chord wing with a Clark Y airfoil replacing the previously tapered wing. The fuselage is of 4130 welded steel tube construction, covered in aircraft fabric. The factory estimates build times at 350–450 hours of labour.

Merlin Manufacturers
Blue Yonder is the fourth manufacturer of the Merlin design. Companies who have built the Merlin were:

Variants
Merlin M50
Initial model, tapered wings, powered by a  Rotax 503 engine
Merlin GT/Sport 65
Initial model, tapered wings, powered by a  Rotax 532 and later by a Rotax 582 or  CAM 100 engine
Merlin EZ
Current model, constant chord wings, powered by a  Rotax 582,  Rotax 618,  Rotax 912UL,  Rotax 912ULS
Merlin TG
Tricycle landing gear model, constant chord wings, powered by a  Rotax 582,  Rotax 912UL,  Rotax 912ULS

Specifications (Merlin EZ Rotax 912ULS)

See also

References

External links

 Blue Yonder Aviation

Merlin
1980s Canadian ultralight aircraft
Homebuilt aircraft
Merlin
High-wing aircraft
Single-engined tractor aircraft
Aircraft first flown in 1987